The Vale do Aço Metropolitan Region (Região Metropolitana do Vale do Aço in Portuguese) is a metropolitan area in Minas Gerais, Brazil, comprising only the four municipalities of Coronel Fabriciano, Ipatinga, Santana do Paraíso and Timóteo, but have an influence area of 22 other municipalities.

History

The name means Steel Valley in Portuguese. This region is also known as "a Região de Siderurgia" (Ironcasting Region), as it holds a great number of iron and steel processing companies along the course of the Rio Doce and its tributary, the Rio Piracicaba.

The industrialization was possible after the construction of the Estrada de Ferro Vitória Minas, a large railway that crossed almost untouched forest regions in the 1920s, to connect the Metropolitan Area of Vitória to Belo Horizonte. Soon after the conclusion of the railway, the ironcasting Belgo-Mineira started its activity in Coronel Fabriciano, buying local timber for charcoal production, using it as fuel for its factories.

In 1944 Acesita, now called ArcelorMittal Timóteo, is installed in nowadays Timóteo. Acesita produces special steel, mainly the stainless steel. In 1948 the municipality of Coronel Fabriciano is emancipated, including in its domains the area of nowadays Timóteo and Ipatinga.

In 1956 Usiminas is installed in the region of Ipatinga. In 1964 both Ipatinga and Timóteo are separated from Coronel Fabriciano.

In 1973 Cenibra is installed in Belo Oriente, a municipality located in Vale do aço's influence area.

The metropolitan area was officially defined in 1998 and has a population of 430,700 (IBGE estimate 2005).

Municipalities

There is officially no main city in the Metropolitan Area of Vale do Aço. However, Ipatinga is much larger than the other cities, with about 240,000 inhabitants. The second largest city is Coronel Fabriciano, with about 105,000 inhabitants, followed by Timóteo, which has 80,000.

Industrial Activity

The largest industries of the region are ArcelorMittal Timóteo and Usiminas, both iron-casting. Cenibra, a pulp factory in Belo Oriente, is also large. There are several other minor industries, some of them heavily connected with the major ones, as suppliers or customers of its products.

The region has a large eucalyptus monoculture, that was initially used to make charcoal for iron-casting. Lately, imported mineral charcoal was adopted in Usiminas and Acesita, so the eucalyptus is now mainly used to supply the pulp factory of Cenibra as raw material.

Photos

See also
 Silicon valley
 Food Valley
 Ipanema Park
 Colégio Angélica

References

External links
 Foodvalley.nl
 Website of the Santana do Paraiso city

Populated places in Minas Gerais
Metropolitan areas of Brazil